Meredith Lee Rainey-Valmon (born October 15, 1968, in Brooklyn, New York) is an American runner who specialized in the 800 metres.

Her personal best time was 1:57.04 minutes, achieved at the 1996 Olympic Trials. She is also a two-time Olympian, in 1992 and 1996.  In 1996, she married fellow US Olympian, 400m runner and 1992 Olympic 4x400 gold medalist Andrew Valmon.

Running for Harvard University, she dominated Ivy League competition and won two NCAA Championships in the 800 meters in 1989, Indoors and Outdoors.  She graduated in 1990.

International competitions

References

External links

 Profile at USA Track & Field

1968 births
Living people
Sportspeople from Brooklyn
Track and field athletes from New York City
American female middle-distance runners
Athletes (track and field) at the 1992 Summer Olympics
Athletes (track and field) at the 1996 Summer Olympics
Olympic track and field athletes of the United States
Athletes (track and field) at the 1995 Pan American Games
Athletes (track and field) at the 1999 Pan American Games
Harvard Crimson women's track and field athletes
Pan American Games gold medalists for the United States
Pan American Games bronze medalists for the United States
Pan American Games medalists in athletics (track and field)
Competitors at the 1989 Summer Universiade
Competitors at the 1990 Goodwill Games
Competitors at the 1994 Goodwill Games
Medalists at the 1995 Pan American Games
Medalists at the 1999 Pan American Games